Alfred Islay Walden (1847 - 1884) was an American poet, teacher, and minister.  He was born in Randolph County, North Carolina and enslaved. He was freed after the American Civil War and studied at Howard University with the intent to become a teacher. Margo Lee Williams wrote a book about him.

He had poor vision. He studied at the New Brunswick Theological Seminary. He published two volumes of poetry. He returned to Randolph County and established a church in Lassiters Mills. He taught at the church on Sundays.

Writings
 Walden's Miscellaneous Poems Which the Author Desires to Dedicate to the Cause of Education and Humanity, 1873
 Walden's Sacred Poems with a Sketch of His Life, Hosford, North Carolina 1877

References

1847 births
1884 deaths
19th-century American poets
African-American poets
People from Randolph County, North Carolina
American freedmen
19th-century American slaves
African-American Christian clergy